Hrlica is a village and municipality in Revúca District in the Banská Bystrica Region of Slovakia.

History
In historical records, the village was first mentioned in 1413 (Gerlyche), when it belonged to Derencsénny feudatories. In the 17th century it passed tu Muráň.

Genealogical resources

The records for genealogical research are available at the state archive "Statny Archiv in Banska Bystrica, Slovakia"

 Roman Catholic church records (births/marriages/deaths): 1810-1896 (parish B)
 Lutheran church records (births/marriages/deaths): 1730-1895 (parish B)

See also
 List of municipalities and towns in Slovakia

References

External links
 
Surnames of living people in Hrlica

Villages and municipalities in Revúca District